Anti-prom, also known as morp (prom spelled backwards), is a social event often staged by high school students as a protest against, or boycott of, their school's official prom, as an alternative celebration. Other times, it may be an unofficial prom, planned by the students themselves so that it is not under the control of the school.

Some of the more common reasons for the creation of an anti-prom include the desire to curb the large cost of a traditional prom, to listen to music other than that expected to be played at the official prom, to have a smaller, more personal get-together, ones that cannot find a date or have been rejected for a prom date, don't like the food, or have looser and less strict rules than the school's (often relating to dress rules or alcohol consumption).  Another common anti-prom is an unofficial dance set up by freshmen and sophomores as they cannot go to prom without a junior or senior.

The attendees of an anti-prom usually disagree with the values of the high school in-crowd who, stereotypically, organize the prom from the preparatory stages to the after-parties. In particular, anti-prom attendees protest what they regard as the vanity, excess, and conformity that the prom culture expects from students. Anti-proms do not follow any prescribed format, catering instead to the varied tastes of the large spectrum of students who feel dissociated from prom culture.  Nevertheless, anti-prom participants are generally concerned with arranging social activities that are not only fun and enjoyable, but which also serve as an assertion of solidarity and of the legitimacy of social difference. 

In the United States, youth belonging to the Church of Jesus Christ of Latter-day Saints often attend morps organized through their church or stake. This is true even in the state of Utah, where a substantial percentage of the youth belong to Mormon families. The custom is that the girls can each ask a boy to take them, but the boys cannot ask the girls.

Queer proms
Sexual orientation and gender identity sometimes play a role in leading students to form and attend an anti-prom (sometimes referred to as a gay prom or queer prom): lesbian, gay, bisexual, transgender, queer, and questioning (LGBTQQ) students who feel that attending their school's traditional prom with a same-sex partner or not identifying in traditional gender identity fashion would be problematic might choose to hold their own gathering. Gay proms began to form in the 1990s, with one of the longest running and oldest being the Hayward Gay Prom, which was first held in 1995.

References

American culture
School dances
LGBT culture in the United States
Prom

ru:Выпускной вечер#Антивыпускной